Frédéric Grossmann (20 September 1895 – 19 December 1979) was a French rower. He competed in the men's eight event at the 1920 Summer Olympics.

References

External links
 

1895 births
1979 deaths
French male rowers
Olympic rowers of France
Rowers at the 1920 Summer Olympics
Sportspeople from Strasbourg
People from Alsace-Lorraine
Alsatian-German people